Robert Smith (5 January 1923 – 26 February 2001) was a South African cricketer. He played in four first-class matches for Border from 1946/47 to 1950/51.

See also
 List of Border representative cricketers

References

External links
 

1923 births
2001 deaths
South African cricketers
Border cricketers